This is a list of Australian television-related events, debuts, finales, and cancellations that are scheduled to occur in 2019, the 64th year of continuous operation of television in Australia.

Events

January

February

April

June

August

October

November

December

Television channels

New channels 

 1 July - SBS World Movies

Channel closures 
 17 May – Your Money
 29 December – 7food network

Premieres

Domestic series

Delayed to 2020

International series

Programming changes

Changes to network affiliation 
Criterion for inclusion in the following list is that Australian premiere episodes will air in Australia for the first time on a new channel. This includes when a program is moved from a free-to-air network's primary channel to a digital multi-channel, as well as when a program moves between subscription television channels – provided the preceding criterion is met. Ended television series which change networks for repeat broadcasts are not included in the list.

Free-to-air premieres 
This is a list of programs which made their premiere on Australian free-to-air television that had previously premiered on Australian subscription television. Programs may still air on the original subscription television network.

Subscription premieres 
This is a list of programs which made their debut on Australian subscription television, having previously premiered on Australian free-to-air television. Programs may still air (first or repeat) on the original free-to-air television network.

Returning programs 
Australian produced programs which are returning with a new season after being absent from television from the previous calendar year.

Endings

Deaths

 see also: (2019 in Australia)

See also 
 2019 in Australia
 List of Australian films of 2019

References